Martin Christian Luther (26 April 1883 Tallinn – 12 March 1963 München) was an Estonians entrepreneur and politician. He was a member of II Riigikogu. On 27 September 1923, he resigned his position and he was replaced by Max Bock.

References

1883 births
1963 deaths
Politicians from Tallinn
People from Kreis Harrien
Baltic-German people
German-Baltic Party politicians
Members of the Riigikogu, 1923–1926
Estonian emigrants to Germany